Poipet railway station is a railway station in Poipet, Banteay Meanchey Province, Cambodia located at 850 meters from the border of Thailand. It is the railway terminus of the Phnom Penh–Poipet Line and it was also connects to the State Railway of Thailand via .

History
The station was built and completed in 1930 during the French colonial era as part of the section between Phnom Penh and Poipet. In 1941, the line was built linking to Thailand, but five years later, it was removed after the World War II ends and it was rebuilt in 1953, upon Cambodia's request and opened it on 22 April 1955, though it was closed again in 1961 due to strained Cambodia–Thailand relations. The cross-border link between Aranyaprathet and Poipet was reopened in April 2019, but closed again in April 2020 due to the COVID-19 pandemic.

References

Railway stations in Cambodia
Cambodia–Thailand border crossings